Henry Meyer may refer to:

 Henry Meyer (poet) (1840–1925), American poet
 Henry Albert Meyer (1894–1968), American philatelist
 Henry Cord Meyer (1912–2001), American historian
 Henry Herman Meyer (1874–1951), American Methodist Episcopal clergyman and editor
 Henry Hoppner Meyer (1780–1847), English portrait painter and engraver

See also
 Henry Maier (1918–1994), American politician and mayor of Milwaukee, Wisconsin
 Henry Mayer (disambiguation)